The Men's omnium at the UCI Track Cycling World Championships was first competed in 2007 in Spain.

Until 20 June 2014, the Omnium consisted of six events: a one-lap flying start time trial, 5 km scratch race, an elimination race known as "the Devil", a 4 km individual pursuit, a 15 km points race, and a 1 km time trial. The placing a rider achieves in each event is converted to points, and the rider with the fewest points at the end of the competition wins.. Prior to the introduction of "the Devil" in 2011, the Omnium consisted of five events.

Effective 20 June 2014, the Omnium consists of six events: a scratch race, a 5 km individual pursuit, an elimination race, a one-lap flying start time trial, a 1 km time trial, and a points race. For the first five events, riders are awarded 40, 38, 36 etc. points for 1st, 2nd 3rd etc. place.  Riders ranked 21st and below are awarded 1 point.  To this total, riders can add and subtract points based on laps gained and lost and points won in sprints in the Points race.  The rider with the highest total of points is the winner.

Three riders have won the event twice, Benjamin Thomas of France, Ethan Hayter of Great Britain and Fernando Gaviria of Colombia. Of these, Thomas, with two golds and two silvers has the best record in the event.

Medalists

Medal table

External links
Track Cycling World Championships 2016–1893 bikecult.com
World Championship, Track, Omnium, Elite cyclingarchives.com

 
Men's omnium
Lists of UCI Track Cycling World Championships medalists